Moralo Club Polideportivo is a football team based in Navalmoral de la Mata in the autonomous community of Extremadura. Founded in 1965, it plays in the Tercera División - Group 14. Its stadium is Municipal de Navalmoral with a capacity of 4,000 seats.

Season to season

3 seasons in Segunda División B
39 seasons in Tercera División

Famous players
 Raúl Fabiani
 José Luis Agote
 José Luis Garzón
 Santi Revilla

Famous coaches
 Joaquín Caparrós

References

External links
 Moralo CP Blog 
 Futbolme team profile 

Football clubs in Extremadura
Association football clubs established in 1965
1965 establishments in Spain
Province of Cáceres